Chou Yen-sheng (born 28 February 1931) is a Taiwanese former sports shooter. He competed in the 25 metre pistol event at the 1968 Summer Olympics.

References

External links
 

1931 births
Possibly living people
Taiwanese male sport shooters
Olympic shooters of Taiwan
Shooters at the 1968 Summer Olympics
20th-century Taiwanese people